Kali Prasad Baskota is a Nepali singer, musician and lyricist. Baskota has also judged in first three season of  Nepali Reality show Nepal Idol.

Career 
He started his music career since 2007/8, as a lyricist and composer for the song Chahana Sakiyo Bahana Sakiyo sung by Sashi Rawal. Some of his earlier hits are Laija Re sung by Hemant Rana, Bida nai deu baru sung by Azad Dhungana. His 2017 song called Saili sung by Hemant Rana was trending worldwide on No. 14 on YouTube after the first week of its release. In feature films he gave songs like Jaalma, Nira, Lappan Chappan, Panchi, Daiba Hey.
Kali did his singing debut from song Jaalma from the movie Resham filili which is of the biggest hit songs in Nepali movie industry. 

In recent times, his song "Thamel Bazaar" from the movie Loot 2 (a sequel to the highly successful movie Loot and directed by Nischal Basnet) is one of the most viewed Nepali songs; it ranks third amongst the most viewed Nepali songs on YouTube. Some of his most recent songs are Ajambari sung by himself and Melina Rai for the movie Gangster Blues starring Aashirman DS Joshi and Anna Sharma, and Okhati from the movie Mr. Jholay starring Dayahang Rai.

Kali is a mechanical engineer by education, and worked at the famous Tilganga Institute of Ophthalmology in Kathmandu for over a decade before becoming a full-time musician since 2015.

Awards

Discographys 
 Entrance (2009) with Sashi Rawal
 Resham Filili (Original Motion Picture Soundtrack) (2016)

References

External links
 

Nepalese musicians
1979 births
Living people